Beyond This Place may refer to:
 Beyond This Place (novel), a 1950 novel by A. J. Cronin
 Beyond This Place (1959 film), a British crime mystery film based on the novel
 Beyond This Place (2010 film), a documentary film
 Beyond This Place (DuPont Show of the Month), a 1957 American television adaptation of the novel